Lents Park is a  public park in southeast Portland, Oregon's Lents neighborhood, in the United States. Acquired in 1914, the park features the Charles B. Walker Stadium (home of the West Coast League's Portland Pickles collegiate baseball team), and has a new playground to replace one built in the 1970s.

Lents Park was the site of at least one Black Lives Matter demonstration in 2020.

In April 2021, a man was shot in the park by the police that responded to multiple calls about a man with a gun. A replica gun was recovered.

See also

 List of parks in Portland, Oregon

References

External links

 Lents Park: Project Overview, Portland Parks & Recreation

1914 establishments in Oregon
Lents, Portland, Oregon
Parks in Portland, Oregon
Protected areas established in 1914